Henry Clay Hamill (1879–1947) was a pioneer Australian rugby league footballer who played in the 1900s, and a co-founder of Rugby League in Australia.

Born to parents William and Isabella Hamill at Redfern, New South Wales in 1879, Harry Hamill was one of the original founders of the Newtown Jets rugby league football club in 1908 and was the club's first captain. Originally a rugby union player with Newtown, Harry Hamill captained the Newtown in their first season before retiring. 

As a founding member of Newtown and pioneer of the game of rugby league in Sydney, Harry Hamill was awarded Life Membership of the NSWRFL in 1914.

Harry Hamill was a journalist during his working life and created the Rugby League News in 1920. This publication became what is now the Big League Magazine.

Harry Hamill died on 19 December 1947, aged 68 late of Woollahra, New South Wales and was survived by his eight children.

References

1879 births
1947 deaths
Newtown Jets players
Australian rugby league players
Australian rugby league administrators
New South Wales rugby league team players
Rugby league players from Sydney